The Italian may refer to:
The Italian (1915 film), a silent film by Reginald Barker
The Italian (2005 film), a Russian film by Andrei Kravchuk
The Italian (Radcliffe novel), a novel by Ann Radcliffe
The Italian (Vassalli novel), a novel by Sebastiano Vassalli
The Italian (album), an album by Patrizio Buanne

See also
Italian (disambiguation)